The Illustris project is an ongoing series of astrophysical simulations run by an international collaboration of scientists. The aim was to study the processes of galaxy formation and evolution in the universe with a comprehensive physical model. Early results were described in a number of publications following widespread press coverage. The project publicly released all data produced by the simulations in April, 2015.  Key developers of the Illustris simulation have been Volker Springel (Max-Planck-Institut für Astrophysik) and Mark Vogelsberger (Massachusetts Institute of Technology). The Illustris simulation framework and galaxy formation model has been used for a wide range of spin-off projects, starting with Auriga and IllustrisTNG (both 2017) followed by Thesan (2021), MillenniumTNG (2022) and TNG-Cluster (to be published in 2023).

Illustris simulation

Overview
The original Illustris project was carried out by Mark Vogelsberger and collaborators as the first large-scale galaxy formation application of Volker Springel's novel Arepo code.

The Illustris project included large-scale cosmological simulations of the evolution of the universe, spanning initial conditions of the Big Bang, to the present day, 13.8 billion years later. Modeling, based on the most precise data and calculations currently available, are compared to actual findings of the observable universe in order to better understand the nature of the universe, including galaxy formation, dark matter and dark energy.

The simulation included many physical processes which are thought to be critical for galaxy formation. These include the formation of stars and the subsequent "feedback" due to supernova explosions, as well as the formation of super-massive black holes, their consumption of nearby gas, and their multiple modes of energetic feedback.

Images, videos, and other data visualizations for public distribution are available at official media page.

Computational aspects
The main Illustris simulation was run on the Curie supercomputer at CEA (France) and the SuperMUC supercomputer at the Leibniz Computing Centre (Germany). A total of 19 million CPU hours was required, using 8,192 CPU cores. The peak memory usage was approximately 25 TB of RAM. A total of 136 snapshots were saved over the course of the simulation, totaling over 230 TB cumulative data volume.

A code called "Arepo" was used to run the Illustris simulations. It was written by Volker Springel, the same author as the GADGET code. The name is derived from the Sator Square. This code solves the coupled equations of gravity and hydrodynamics using a discretization of space based on a moving Voronoi tessellation. It is optimized for running on large, distributed memory supercomputers using an MPI approach.

Public data release
In April, 2015 (eleven months after the first papers were published) the project team publicly released all data products from all simulations. All original data files can be directly downloaded through the data release webpage. This includes group catalogs of individual halos and subhalos, merger trees tracking these objects through time, full snapshot particle data at 135 distinct time points, and various supplementary data catalogs. In addition to direct data download, a web-based API allows for many common search and data extraction tasks to be completed without needing access to the full data sets.

German postage stamp
In December 2018, the Illustris simulation was recognized by Deutsche Post through a special series stamp.

Illustris Spin-Off Projects

The Illustris simulation framework has been used by a wide range of spin-off projects that focus on specific scientific questions. 
IllustrisTNG:
The IllustrisTNG project, "the next generation" follow up to the original Illustris simulation, was first presented in July, 2017. A team of scientists from Germany and the U.S. led by Prof. Volker Springel. First, a new physical model was developed, which among other features included Magnetohydrodynamics planned three simulations, which used different volumes at different resolutions. The intermediate simulation (TNG100) was equivalent to the original Illustris simulation. Unlike Illustris, it was run on the Hazel Hen machine at the High Performance Computing Center, Stuttgart in Germany. Up to 25,000 computer cores were employed.  In December 2018 the simulation data from IllustrisTNG was released publicly. The data service includes a JupyterLab interface.
Auriga:
The Auriga project consists of high-resolution zoom simulations of Milky Way-like dark matter halos to understand the formation of our Milky Way galaxy.
Thesan:
The Thesan project is a radiative-transfer version of IllustrisTNG to explore the epoch of reionization.
MillenniumTNG:
The MillenniumTNG employs the IllustrisTNG galaxy formation model in a larger cosmological volume to explore the massive end of the halo mass function for detailed cosmological probe forecasts.
TNG-Cluster:
A suite of high-resolution zoom-in simulations of galaxy clusters.

Gallery

See also

 Computational fluid dynamics
 Large-scale structure of the universe
 List of cosmological computation software
 Millennium Run
 N-body simulation
 UniverseMachine

References

External links
 
 Press release - Center for Astrophysics  Harvard & Smithsonian (7 May 2014).
  - Illustris-Project (6 May 2014).
  - NASA (14 July 2014)
 - article containing a comparison table of different simulation projects

Astrophysics
Cosmological simulation
Physical cosmology